Cassine glauca, known as නෙරලු (neralu) in Sinhala, is a species of large tree in the staff vine family, Celastraceae, its natural range extends through the Indo-Malayan region in subtropical mixed deciduous and evergreen forests.

External links
 http://indiabiodiversity.org/species/show/31165
 http://www.theplantlist.org/tpl1.1/record/kew-2704283
 http://opendata.keystone-foundation.org/cassine-glauca-rottb-kuntze

glauca
Flora of Sri Lanka